The 1950 Football Championship of UkrSSR were part of the 1950 Soviet republican football competitions in the Soviet Ukraine.

Qualification group stage

Group 1

Group 2

Group 3

Group 4

Final

Promotional playoff
 FC Kharchovyk Odesa – FC Spartak Uzhhorod 1:1 0:1

References

External links
 1950. Football Championship of the UkrSSR (1950. Первенство УССР.) Luhansk Nash Futbol.
 Group 1: ukr-football.org.ua
 Group 2: ukr-football.org.ua
 Group 3: ukr-football.org.ua
 Group 4: ukr-football.org.ua
 Group 5: ukr-football.org.ua
 Group 6: ukr-football.org.ua
 Final: ukr-football.org.ua

Ukraine
Football Championship of the Ukrainian SSR
Championship